NNSL Media (Northern News Services LTD) is a news and media company based in Yellowknife, Northwest Territories.  It is one of the few remaining independent newspaper companies in Canada, producing all-original content with little to no reliance on syndicated news. NNSL publishes seven different papers weekly: Kivalliq News, Inuvik Drum, Dehcho Drum, Yellowknifer (Wednesday and Friday editions), News/North (Northwest Territories News/North and Nunavut News/North).

In March 2021, Black Press, a Canadian publisher of over 170 newspapers in Canada and the United States, purchased NNSL. According to a report, NNSL had been on sale for over a year.

References

Newspaper companies of Canada
Mass media in Yellowknife
Mass media in Nunavut
Mass media in the Northwest Territories
Privately held companies of Canada
Newspapers established in 1972
1972 establishments in Canada